Bijar Pes (also Romanized as Bījār Pes and Bījār Pas; also known as Bidzharpas, Bījārīsh, and Bījār Pes-e Avval) is a village in Howmeh Rural District, in the Central District of Rasht County, Gilan Province, Iran. At the 2006 census, its population was 660, in 184 families.

References 

Populated places in Rasht County